The 2010 New Era Pinstripe Bowl  was the first edition of this college football bowl game, and was played at Yankee Stadium in Bronx, New York.  The game started at 3:20 p.m. ET on December 30, 2010, and was telecast on ESPN.  The game featured the Syracuse Orange of the Big East Conference and the Kansas State Wildcats of the Big 12 Conference. New Era Cap Company was the title sponsor of the game. It ended with Syracuse defeating Kansas State, 36-34.

The game was played four days after one of the worst blizzards in New York City history, affecting travel for the teams and their fans.

Teams

Kansas State Wildcats

Kansas State officially accepted an invitation to the bowl on December 3, 2010, after completing a 7-5 regular season.  The bowl marked the Wildcats return to post-season for the first time since 2006.  It was the 14th bowl game in school history for K-State.  Coach Bill Snyder coached the Wildcats in all but two of their previous bowls.

Syracuse Orange

Syracuse officially accepted an invitation to the bowl on December 3, 2010.  Second year head coach Doug Marrone, who grew up in the Bronx, just minutes from the old Yankee Stadium led the Orange to a 7-5 record and their first bowl game since the 2004 Champs Sports Bowl.  Syracuse was required to win seven games in order to become bowl-eligible as two of their victories came over Football Championship Subdivision opponents.  Only one of the victories is allowed to count toward bowl eligibility.

Game summary

Scoring

Statistics

The Bronx Salute

The call
With 1:13 left in the game, Kansas State's Adrian Hilburn scored a 30-yard touchdown to pull KSU within two points of a tie.  Following the score, Hilburn made a military hand salute toward the crowd and was penalized for unsportsmanlike conduct.  Because of the 15-yard penalty, Kansas State had to attempt a two-point conversion from the 17-yard line.  The conversion failed, accounting for the margin in the final score.  The call was considered highly controversial, and according to ESPN determined the outcome of the game.

Aftermath
Due to the impact from this call, the NCAA chose in the next year's rule changes to not penalize celebrating in general but to penalize only taunting.  The call was called "one of the most infamous plays of the college football season in 2010" and was given the name "The Bronx Salute."  It later was used as an example of incorrect interpretation of the new celebration rules.

Notes
 This was the first bowl game played in New York since the 1962 Gotham Bowl (at old Yankee Stadium), where 6,166 fans saw Nebraska defeat Miami 36-34 on frozen turf.
 Syracuse and Kansas State met twice before in school history.  All of their matchups have come in bowl games.  K-State defeated the Orange in the 1997 Fiesta Bowl, 35-18 and the Orange were victorious by a score of 26-3 in the 2001 Insight.com Bowl. This was their first meeting outside the Phoenix Metropolitan Area.
Senior Andrew Lewis and freshman Brice Hawkes were suspended for a rules violation by Syracuse head coach Doug Marrone.
 The final result of the 2010 Pinstripe Bowl was subject to criticism due to an "Excessive Celebration" Penalty against Kansas State (see section above: The Bronx Salute).

References

External links
 Box score at ESPN

2010–11 NCAA football bowl games
2010
2010
2010
December 2010 sports events in the United States
2010 in sports in New York City
2010 Pinstripe Bowl